Vârciorog is a commune in Bihor County, Crișana, Romania. It is composed of four villages: Fâșca (Várfancsika), Surducel (Kisszurdok), Șerghiș (Serges), and Vârciorog.

Nestled at the foot of the Pădurea Craiului Mountains, it lies on the banks of the river Topa; the river Vârciorog flows into the Topa in Vârciorog village.

Population
According to the 2011 census, the commune has 2,304 inhabitants, 97.27% of whom are ethnic Romanians. In terms of religious affiliation, 82.47% are Romanian Orthodox, 13.02% Pentecostal, and 2.34% Baptists.

Natives
 Emanuel Dat (born 2001), footballer

References

Communes in Bihor County
Localities in Crișana